Alessandro Deljavan (born February 1, 1987) is an Italian classical pianist.

Biography
He began studying piano when he was not even two years old. After receiving a degree from the Conservatory of Milan, Italy, he was selected for the prestigious Lake Como International Piano Association where he studied with William Grant Naboré, Dimitri Bashkirov, Laurent Boullet, Fou Ts'ong, Dominique Merlet, John Perry, Menahem Pressler, and Andreas Staier.

Concert activity 
He has performed in Europe (Italy, Belgium, France, Germany, UK, Poland, Slovakia, Russia), as well as Argentina, Colombia, and the United States.

Prizes 
In 1996 he won the 1er Prix, 1er Nommé de la discipline piano classique, degré virtuosité in Paris, Rueil-Malmaison.

Other prizes include 5th place at the 2005 Gina Bachauer International Young Artists Competition, the John Giordano Jury chairman Discretionary Award ($4.000) at the 2009 Van Cliburn International Piano Competition, Fort Worth, Texas, and the 2nd prize at the 2010 Isang Yun Competition, Tongyeong, South Korea. In 2013 he was the unique competitor to return to the Cliburn as a competitor; his exclusion from the final round had been criticized by the critics; he was awarded with the  Raymond E. Buck Jury Discretionary Award ($4,000). After few days from his exclusion he voluntarily retired from the Cleveland International Piano Competition by which he was selected as the only Italian pianist.

Recordings 
He recorded for OnClassical, Piano Classics and Naxos.

Notes

External links 
  artist website with curriculum, reviews, photos, videos, discography and calendar

Italian classical pianists
Male classical pianists
Italian male pianists
Living people
Place of birth missing (living people)
1987 births
21st-century classical pianists
21st-century Italian male musicians
People from Giulianova